The Ernst Schering Prize is awarded annually by the Ernst Schering Foundation for especially outstanding basic research in the fields of medicine, biology or chemistry anywhere in the world. Established in 1991 by the Ernst Schering Research Foundation, and named after the German apothecary and industrialist, Ernst Christian Friedrich Schering, who founded the Schering Corporation, the prize is now worth €50,000.

Recipients
Source: Schering Foundation

1992 , (Center for Molecular Biology, University of Heidelberg, Germany)
1993 Christiane Nüsslein-Volhard, (Max Planck Institute for Developmental Biology in Tübingen, Germany)
1994 Bert Vogelstein, (Oncology Center, Johns Hopkins University, Baltimore, Maryland, US)
1995 Yasutomi Nishizuka, (Kobe University, Japan)
1996 Judah Folkman, (Harvard Medical School, Harvard University, Boston, US)
1997 Johann Mulzer, (Institute for Organic Chemistry, University of Vienna, Austria)
1998 Ilme Schlichting, (Max Planck Institute for Molecular Physiology in Dortmund, Germany)
1999 Michael Berridge, (Babraham Institute in Cambridge, UK)
2000 , (University of Tokyo, Japan)
2001 Kyriacos Nicolaou, (University of California, San Diego, California, and The Scripps Research Institute, La Jolla, California, US)
2002 Ian Wilmut, (The Roslin Institute in Edinburgh, UK)
2003 Svante Pääbo, (Max Planck Institute for Evolutionary Anthropology in Leipzig, Germany)
2004 , (National Institute of Neurological Disorders and Stroke (NINDS), Bethesda, Maryland, US)
2005 Thomas Tuschl, (Laboratory of RNA Molecular Biology, Rockefeller University, New York)
2006 Wolfgang Baumeister, (Max Planck Institute of Biochemistry in Martinsried, Germany) 
2007 Carolyn Bertozzi, (University of California, Berkeley, US)
2008 Klaus Rajewsky, (Harvard Medical School, Boston, US)
2009 Rudolf Jaenisch, (Whitehead Institute, Cambridge, Massachusetts, US)
2010 Marc Feldmann and Sir Ravinder Maini, (Kennedy Institute of Rheumatology at Imperial College London, UK)
2011 Bert W. O'Malley, (Tom Thompson Distinguished Service Professor and Chair of Molecular and Cellular Biology at Baylor College of Medicine in Houston, Texas)
2012 Matthias Mann, (Max Planck Institute of Biochemistry in Martinsried, Germany)
2013 , (Institute of Molecular Virology at the Ulm University Medical Center in Ulm, Germany)
2014 Magdalena Götz, (Director of the Institute of Stem Cell Research at the Helmholtz Zentrum München and chair of Physiological Genomics at the University of Munich (LMU) in Munich, Germany)
2015 David MacMillan, (Professor of Chemistry at Princeton University, US).
2016 Franz-Ulrich Hartl, (Max Planck Institute of Biochemistry in Martinsried, Germany).
2017 Elly Tanaka, (Senior Scientist at Research Institute of Molecular Pathology in Vienna, Austria)
2018 Bonnie L. Bassler, (Princeton University, New Jersey)
2019 Patrick Cramer, (Director at the Max Planck Institute for Biophysical Chemistry in Göttingen)
2020 , (Director at the ( in Cologne)
2021 Aviv Regev, (Head of Genentech Research and Early Development in South San Francisco, US)
2022  (Professor of Computer-Assisted Drug Design at the Institute of Pharmaceutical Sciences at ETH Zurich and director of the Singapore-ETH Center)

See also

 List of biology awards
 List of biochemistry awards
 List of chemistry awards
 List of medicine awards

References

This article has been translated from the equivalent article on German Wikipedia

External links
 

Awards established in 1991
Biochemistry awards
Biology awards
Chemistry awards
German science and technology awards
1991 establishments in Germany
Medicine awards